DocHub is an online PDF annotator and document signing platform that can work on desktop platforms and mobile platforms; founded by DocHub and Macroplant CEO Chris Devor in Boston, Massachusetts, United States, with headquarter regions in the Greater Boston Area, East Coast, and New England. DocHub has several features that lets users add text, draw, add signatures and make document templates.

Features

Integrated Apps and Software Features 
DocHub integrated Google Drive, Gmail, Google Workspace, Google Contacts, Shift, and Dropbox that allows users to create a PDF or document while using the online annotator or allows users to upload existing documents to annotate.

Editing Features 
DocHub has features that allows users to edit documents by adding annotations, comments/notes, merge text, rearrange document pages, and convert documents to a PDF if needed. In annotating and editing DocHub allows users to insert pictures to documents, add text, draw, highlight, and underline existing text.

Digital Signature Features 
Features that DocHub offer in the category of digital signing and signatures include multi-party signing, adding watermarks to documents, authentication, and an audit trail. This allows users to request signatures from other people or parties through email and other digital resources.

Funding 
DocHub as a company in its first funding round raised $200 thousand in September 2014, as a seed funding and no other funding rounds have been reported.

Security

Safe For User 
DocHub is seen as safe for users to upload, editing, downloading documents, and more.

User Private Information 
The platform ensures that user's private information is not shared, and users can delete and edit profile details whenever needed. If an account is hacked or breached the platform will send an email to the user of the account.

Legal Bindings 
This platform also complies with the U.S. Electronic Signature in Global and National Commerce Act of 2000 (ESIGN). This makes the electronic signature feature to be legally binding.

References 

Online companies of the United States
PDF software